Nigori or  is a variety of sake, an alcoholic beverage produced from rice. Its name translates roughly to "cloudy" because of its appearance. It is about 12–17% alcohol by volume, averaging 15% with some as high as 20%.

Description 
Sake is usually filtered to remove grain solids left behind after the fermentation process. Nigori sake is filtered using a broader mesh, resulting in the permeating of fine rice particles and a far cloudier drink. Unfiltered sake is known as doburoku (どぶろく, but also 濁酒) and was originally brewed across Japan by farming families. However, it was banned in the Meiji period, though it has since been revived as a local brewing tradition. The area around Mihara village in southern Shikoku is especially well known for its doburoku breweries.

Commercial reintroduction 
Brewer Tokubee Masuda, of Kyoto-based Tsukino Katsura brewery, which began in 1675, looked to bring back hundred-year-old recipes and traditional production methods available to modernize their products.  Beginning in 1964 (or 1966), Masuda began lobbying the Japanese government to relax sake production-laws in order to produce an unfiltered sake that would be cloudy and offer a visual component, similar to European wines. The result was a sake that was cloudy, effervescent, unpasteurized, and slightly sweeter. Author John Gauntner, discussing the production process that allowed nigori to be considered as sake, notes:"What they did was create a cage-like device, an insert with holes in its walls that fit into a tank of sake. The sake that leaked through the holes in the center of the insert was then drawn off and bottled. The government determined that as long as the holes in the mesh were no larger than 2 millimeters in diameter, the result of filtration using the cage could legally be considered sake. Hence, nigori was born as a genre of sake. Other breweries later followed suit, using their own contraptions."Gauntner also remarked that currently, most brewers no longer bother filtering out the sake, but will instead dilute the final product with filtered sake. Formerly, only water could be added to sake after fermenting, but current laws state that only water and sake can be added afterward.

In 2010, a brewer from Akita Prefecture came up with a dark version of nigori sake, the color of which is due to the addition of edible finely powdered charcoal.

Consumption 
Nigori sake is generally the sweet sake, with a fruity nose and a mild flavor, making a great drink to complement spicy foods or as a dessert wine. Nigori sake is sometimes unpasteurized namazake, which means that it is still fermenting and has a effervescent quality. Therefore, shaking the bottle or exposing it to high temperatures may cause the sake to spurt out of the bottle, so care should be taken when opening the bottle. When first opening the bottle, the cap should be slightly opened and then closed repeatedly to release the gas that has filled the bottle little by little. To maximize the flavor of nigori sake, there are some tips on how to drink it. First drink only the clear supernatant, then close the cap and slowly turn the bottle upside down to mix the sediment with the clear sake to enjoy the change in flavor. It is advised that it be served well-chilled, storing it in an ice bucket to keep it from warming up between servings. It is recommended, as with most sake, to consume the entire bottle once opened before it begins to oxidize, altering its flavor.

Nigori sake is more popular in the United States than in Japan, as are other less traditional varieties, which has led to an increase of American sake brewers.

See also

 Amazake – a Japanese rice wine
 Makgeolli – Korean equivalent of Nigori
 Choujiu – Chinese equivalent of Nigori
 List of rice beverages

References

External links
 http://sakefanworld.info/brewer/187/
 http://www.tsukinokatsura.co.jp

Sake